This is a list of monuments in Tanahun District, Nepal as officially recognized by and available through the website of the Department of Archaeology, Nepal. Tanahun is a district of Gandaki Province and is located in central parts of Nepal. Hindu temples are the main attraction of this district.

List of monuments

|}

See also 
 List of monuments in Gandaki Province
 List of monuments in Nepal

References

External links

Tanahun